The family Micrococcaceae includes bacterial genera of Gram positive cocci that inhabit the air and skin, such as  Micrococcus luteus.

Genera
The family Micrococcaceae comprises the following genera:

 Acaricomes Pukall et al. 2006
 Arthrobacter Conn and Dimmick 1947 (Approved Lists 1980)
 Auritidibacter Yassin et al. 2011

 Citricoccus Altenburger et al. 2002
 Enteractinococcus Cao et al. 2012
 Falsarthrobacter Busse and Moore 2018
 Galactobacter Hahne et al. 2019
 Garicola Lo et al. 2015
 Glutamicibacter Busse 2016
 Haematomicrobium Schumann and Busse 2017
 Kocuria Stackebrandt et al. 1995
 Micrococcoides Tóth et al. 2017
 Micrococcus Cohn 1872 (Approved Lists 1980)
 Neomicrococcus Prakash et al. 2015
 Nesterenkonia Stackebrandt et al. 1995
 Paenarthrobacter Busse 2016
 Paeniglutamicibacter Busse 2016

 Pseudarthrobacter Busse 2016
 Pseudoglutamicibacter Busse 2016
 Psychromicrobium Schumann et al. 2017
 Renibacterium Sanders and Fryer 1980
 Rothia Georg and Brown 1967 (Approved Lists 1980)
 Sinomonas Zhou et al. 2009
 Specibacter Lee and Schumann 2019

 Tersicoccus Vaishampayan et al. 2013

 Yaniella Li et al. 2008
 Zafaria Amin et al. 2021
 Zhihengliuella Zhang et al. 2007

Phylogeny
The currently accepted taxonomy is based on the List of Prokaryotic names with Standing in Nomenclature and the phylogeny is based on whole-genome sequences.

Notes

References

External links
  NCBI Taxonomy Browser